Krasnoselsky (masculine), Krasnoselskaya (feminine), or Krasnoselskoye (neuter) may refer to:
Mark Krasnosel'skii (1920–1997), Russian/Ukrainian mathematician
Vadim Krasnoselsky (born 1970), Transnistrian politician
Krasnoselsky District, several districts in Russia
Krasnoselsky (inhabited locality) (Krasnoselskaya, Krasnoselskoye), several inhabited localities in Russia
Krasnoselskaya, a station of the Moscow Metro, Moscow, Russia

See also
 Krasnoselsk (disambiguation)
 Krasnoye Selo (inhabited locality)